George Lyle may refer to:
George B. Lyle, interim mayor of Atlanta in 1942
George Lyle (ice hockey) (born 1953), professional ice hockey player